The Ministry of Radio Technology (Minradioprom) was a government ministry in the Soviet Union.

Established as Ministry of Radiotechnical Industry in 1954, under present name since 1965; involved in research and production of television sets, radios, tape recorders, computers, radio instruments, and other electronic gear. In the 1980s it became a major producer of Soviet personal computers, including the Agat, ES-184x and PKSOxx.

List of ministers
Source:
 Valeri Kalmykov (21.1.1954 - 8.4.1974)
 Pjotr Pleshakov (8.4.1974 - 11.9.1987)
 Vladimir Shimko (14.11.1987 - 24.8.1991)

References

External links
 

 
Industry in the Soviet Union